Humboldt is a rural locality in the Central Highlands Region, Queensland, Australia.

Geography 
The Dawson Highway forms the southern boundary of the locality and the ridgeline of the Expedition Range forms the eastern boundary.

There are a number of protected areas:

 Shotover State Forest in the north-east of the locality
 Expedition State Forect in the south-east
 Humboldt State Forest and the Humboldt National Park in the centre
The Shotover Range  runs north-south through the centre of the locality including the national park.

Apart from these protected areas, the predominant land use is grazing on native vegetation.

Letter Camp. and Wilsons Camp are two neighhourhoods in the north-west of the locality.

There are a number of homesteads in the locality:

 Bundaburra 
 Bungawarra with airstrip
 Humboldt
 Katrina
 Kulandra
 Old Redrock
 Penrose
 Planet Downs with airstrip
 Rockland Springs
 Somerby with airstrip
 Sunlight
 Washpool with airstrip.
 Wybalena with airstrip

History
Expedition Range was named on 27 November 1844 by explorer Ludwig Leichhardt who described it as "particularly striking and imposing".

Education 
There are no schools in the locality. The nearest primary schools are Rolleston State School in Rolleston to the south-west and Blackwater State School in Blackwater to the north. The nearest secondary school is Blackwater State High School in Blackwater; however, some parts of the locality are so distant that distance education and boarding schools would be other options.

References 

Central Highlands Region
Localities in Queensland